"This Flight Tonight" is a song originally by Joni Mitchell, from her 1971 album Blue. Scottish hard rock band Nazareth released the song as a single in 1973 that charted internationally.

Original recording
Joni Mitchell wrote and released the song on her 1971 album Blue. The song tells of Mitchell's regrets as she leaves her lover on a flight and wishes to return. The track was also released as the B-side of "Carey".

Mitchell plays guitar and sings, and was the producer; Henry Lewy was the engineer.

Nazareth cover

Scottish hard rock band Nazareth reworked the song in 1973 to make it their own with a powerful, driving hard-rock treatment which was a hit in Canada, Germany (where it reached number one) and the UK. It was produced by Roger Glover. The single reached number 11 in the UK charts in November 1973. The band re-recorded the song in 1991 for the album No Jive.

Writing in The Independent in 2012, Robert Webb said:
The Dunfermline hard-rockers Nazareth loved Blue. You remember them: the gap-toothed vocalist, Dan McCafferty, had hair like a kitchen scourer and a voice to match. They were bad, bad boys. Among the tracks on their 1973 album Loud 'n' Proud, produced by the former Deep Purple bassist Roger Glover, is a taut version of "This Flight". "We used to listen to Joni as we were travelling round in the van," recalls Nazareth's bass-player, Pete Agnew. "'This Flight Tonight' was a big favourite."

Mitchell was impressed with the makeover: "When she was recording at A&M, we were just starting an American tour," explains Agnew. "We all happened to be in the studio the day the single was released, so we were introduced to her and told her what we had done. She said, 'What, with a rock band?'" Joni paid the Scottish band the greatest compliment after "This Flight Tonight" became a worldwide hit for them, touching down at No 11 in the UK. "She was playing a gig in London and told the audience: 'I'd like to open with a Nazareth song'!".

Nancy Wilson revealed that the guitar riff for Nazareth's version of "This Flight Tonight" inspired the riff for the Heart song "Barracuda".

Charts

Weekly charts

Year-end charts

References

1971 songs
Joni Mitchell songs
Songs written by Joni Mitchell
Nazareth (band) songs
Song recordings produced by Joni Mitchell
1973 singles
Song recordings produced by Roger Glover
Mooncrest Records singles